Adjaw Edmée Onésima Diagne (born 1 May 1998), known as Edmée Diagne, is a Senegalese footballer who plays as a midfielder for Lycée Ameth Fall and the Senegal women's national team.

Club career
Diagne has played for Lycée Ameth Fall in Saint-Louis, Senegal.

International career
Diagne capped for Senegal at senior level during the 2022 Africa Women Cup of Nations qualification.

References

External links

1998 births
Living people
Sportspeople from Saint-Louis, Senegal
Senegalese women's footballers
Women's association football midfielders
Senegal women's international footballers